Nayakampalli is a village in East Godavari District, Andhra Pradesh, India.

References

Villages in East Godavari district